Victoria Township is a township in Rice County, Kansas, in the United States.

History
Victoria Township was established in 1877.

Geography
Victoria Township is located at the coordinates . According to the United States Census Bureau, the township has a total area of 36.24 sq mi (93.86 km2), of which 36.22 sq mi (93.81 km2) are land and 0.02 sq mi(0.05 km2 are water.

Demographics
According to the 2010 census Victoria Township had a population of 345 and a population density of 9.5 inhabitants/sq mi (3.7/km2). The racial makeup of the 345 inhabitants was 95.7% white, 0.3% African American, 0% Native American, 0%Asian, 0% Pacific Islander, 1.2% other races, and 2.9% from two or more races. 4.1% of the population were Hispanic or Latino of any race.

References

Townships in Rice County, Kansas
Townships in Kansas